The 2011 Challenge Trophy was hosted in Brossard, Quebec over Thanksgiving Weekend.  With the addition of both territories, there will be 12 teams this year.  They will be divided into 4 groups of 3 teams each.

Results

First round

Standings

Group A

Group B

Group C

Group D

Play-offs

Final result

Teams
The national competition brings together all provincial champions.  The provincial competition formats are all varied, some are leagues with a play-off and some are cups.  The following table attempts to highlight all the teams in Canada who have national aspirations.

References

External links 

Results (announced).

Canadian National Challenge Cup
Canadian
Chall